Gaza Sanjak was a sanjak of the Damascus Eyalet, Ottoman Empire centered in Gaza. In the 16th century it was divided into nawahi (singular: nahiya; third-level subdivisions): Gaza in the south and Ramla in the north.

List of settlements
In the 1596- daftar, the sanjak contained the following nahiyah and villages/town

Gaza Nahiyah

Al-Sawafir al-Sharqiyya, Bayt Tima,   Hamama, Al-Tina, Yibna, Isdud, Arab Suqrir, Deir al-Balah, Burayr, Jabalia, Beit Lahia, Al-Majdal, Askalan, Bayt 'Affa, Najd, Ni'ilya,  Bayt Jirja,  Hiribya, Qatra, Iraq Suwaydan, Kawkaba, Beit Jimal Monastery,  Al-Batani al-Sharqi, Al-Qubayba, Al-Faluja, Bayt Daras,  Al-Maghar,  Hatta, Jusayr, Zikrin, Zayta,  Barqa,  Beit Hanoun, Dayr Sunayd, Simsim, Al-Jaladiyya, 'Ajjur, Al-Sawafir al-Gharbiyya,  Julis,  Karatiyya,  Bayt Jibrin,  Iraq al-Manshiyya,  Qastina,  Ibdis, Idnibba,  Jilya,  Rafah,  Al-Jura,  Tell es-Safi,  Abasan al-Kabera,   Al-Sawafir al-Shamaliyya,   Summil,   Barbara,   Al-Muharraqa,   Mughallis,   Yasur

Ramla Nahiyah

Qula,  Dayr Tarif,  Jaffa, Jimzu,  Kharruba,  Barfiliya,  Sarafand al-Amar,  Artuf,  Bayt Susin,  Islin, Al-Khayriyya,  Khulda,  Al-Tira,  Dayr Ayyub,  Qibya,  Bayt Nabala,  Budrus,  Bnei Brak,  Imwas,   Aqir,  Deir Qaddis, Yalo, al-Midya, Shuqba, Salama, Sar'a, Saqiya, Lod, Jisr Jindas,  Bayt Dajan,  Al-Safiriyya,  Al-'Abbasiyya,  Yazur,  Innaba,  Rantiya,  Bir Ma'in,  Bayt Shanna,  Ni'lin,  Kharbatha Bani Harith,  Kasla, Aboud,  Beit Sira,  Kafr 'Ana

References

Bibliography

States and territories established in 1549
Ottoman Palestine
Sanjaks of Ottoman Syria
1516 establishments in the Ottoman Empire
1916 disestablishments in the Ottoman Empire
1549 establishments in the Ottoman Empire